Reverend or Father John A. O'Brien(1893–1980), whose full name was John Anthony O'Brien, was an influential progressive American catholic scholar pamphleteer and writer.

Early life
John was born On the 20th of  January 1893 in Peoria, Illinois. He was ordained as a priest of the Diocese of Peoria by Bishop Edmund M. Dunne. He served as chaplain for the Catholic students at the University of Illinois and earned a Ph.D. in psychology there. He started the Newman Foundation at the University of Illinois.

Career
His career as an author began from the 'Catholics and Scholarship" and "The White Harvest' a symposia he organized.  In 1938 he published a book about Catholicism called 'The Faith of Millions' which became a best seller. For twenty-two years, He was in the University of Illinois. In 1939, he spent a year at Oxford University and published 'Thunder from the Left', comment on communism. At the University of Notre Dame,he held professorship and wrote his works.

Birth control
John's work focused a lot on connecting science to Catholicism. The concern on birth control in the context of Catholics in America arose as a result of fall of family economies in the light of the great depression in the 1930s and approval of artificial contraceptions by Jewish andanglican religious bodies. He had an attempt that was progressive at the time which moved the issue of birth control away from religion, and incorporated into the realm of science, and suggested a third alternative called "rhythm method", which contrasted with conservatives in the Catholic church(which suggested total abstinence,as exemplified by the encyclical Casti connubii) and separated from artificial conception.

Awards and Death
In 1973, the University of Notre Dame awarded him the Laetare Medal. He died on 18 April 1980 in South Bend, Indiana, after a long illness.

References

External links
 Works of john a. obrien

American Christian writers
20th-century American Roman Catholic priests
Religious views on birth control